Lilia Gorilska (born 26 February 1988, in Kryvyi Rih) is a Ukrainian handballer playing for Moyra-Budaörs and the Ukraine national team.

References 

Sportspeople from Kryvyi Rih
1988 births
Living people
Ukrainian female handball players
Expatriate handball players
Ukrainian expatriate sportspeople in Romania
Ukrainian expatriate sportspeople in Russia
Ukrainian expatriate sportspeople in Serbia
Ukrainian expatriate sportspeople in Hungary
Ukrainian expatriate sportspeople in France